Richard Paul Mitchell (1925–1983) was a history professor at the University of Michigan and a foreign intelligence officer. He is the author of 27 works in 90 publications in 4 languages, and the award-winning book The Society of the Muslim Brothers.

References

Explanatory notes

1925 births
1983 deaths
University of Michigan faculty